Josh Rowland (born 25 September 1988) is a New Zealand-born professional rugby union player who represents Ireland internationally. He plays primarily as a fullback and a wing. Rowland currently plays for Irish provincial side Connacht in the Pro14.

Early life
Rowland was born in Auckland, New Zealand. He attended Rosehill College. Rowland's grandmother came from Dublin in Ireland.

Club career

Career in New Zealand
Rowland played at provincial level in New Zealand. He was part of the Counties Manukau development team that won the Northern Region Development Competition in 2012.

Rowland played for North Harbour in the 2015 ITM Cup, making seven appearances and scoring one try. During this time he also captained North Harbour's sevens team. Under Rowland's captaincy, the side made it to the final of New Zealand's national sevens competition, but were beaten by Counties Manukau.

Connacht
July 2016, it was announced that Rowland had joined Irish provincial side Connacht.

International
Rowland qualified to play for Ireland through his grandmother, who came from Dublin. In 2016, he joined the Ireland national rugby sevens team. He made his first appearance for the side in a qualification repechage for the 2016 Rio Olympics, which took place in Monaco. Rowland also played in the Rugby Europe Trophy in July 2016, which Ireland won. Rowland also played in the 2017 Grand Prix sevens series.

References

1988 births
Living people
People from Auckland
Expatriate rugby union players in Ireland
Irish rugby union players
New Zealand expatriate sportspeople in Ireland
New Zealand expatriate rugby union players
New Zealand rugby union players
New Zealand male rugby sevens players
Rugby union fullbacks
Rugby union players from Auckland
Ireland international rugby sevens players
Connacht Rugby players
North Harbour rugby union players
People educated at Rosehill College